This article lists drivers who have been fatally injured while competing in or in preparation for (testing, practice, qualifying) races sanctioned by the National Association for Stock Car Auto Racing (NASCAR).  A separate list compiles drivers who have died of a medical condition while driving or shortly thereafter and another section shows non-driver deaths.

The NASCAR Cup Series has seen 29 driver fatalities, the most recent of which occurred on February 18, 2001, when Dale Earnhardt was killed on the last lap of the Daytona 500.

Safety in the sport has evolved through the decades.  Technological advances in roll cages, window nets, seat mounts, air flaps, driving suits, and helmets as well as the HANS device, on-site medical facilities with helicopters, improved track emergency responders, and SAFER barriers have contributed to the prevention of further deaths.

Driver fatalities

NASCAR Cup Series fatalities 
This list shows NASCAR Cup Series fatalities.

Breakdown

Fatalities in other series

Drivers who have died of a medical condition 
This list covers both drivers who crashed their cars after suffering a fatal medical condition, i.e. they did not die of the injuries they may have sustained in the ensuing accident, and those who managed to stop their cars but succumbed to a medical condition a little later.

Non-driver fatalities 
This section includes bystanders participating in an event who were killed while on the sidelines.

NASCAR Cup Series fatalities 
This list shows NASCAR Cup Series fatalities.

Fatalities in other series

See also 
Death of Dale Earnhardt
List of Daytona International Speedway fatalities

Notes

References

External links 
Tragic Stats
Racing-reference.info
Tony Jankowiak
Motorsport Memorial
Midwest Roadside Safety Facility – designers of the SAFER Barrier

Lists of auto racing people
Lists of motorsport fatalities
Motorsport in North America
Fatal accidents
North America sport-related lists